Timothy Jackson "Tim" Drake is a superhero appearing in American comic books published by DC Comics, commonly in association with the superhero Batman. Created by Marv Wolfman and Pat Broderick, he first appeared in Batman #436 (August 1989) as the third character to assume the role of Batman's crime-fighting partner and sidekick Robin. Following the events of Batman: Battle for the Cowl in 2009, Drake adopted the identity of Red Robin. In 2019, Tim returned to his original Robin persona and briefly used the mononym "Drake".

As a young boy, Tim was in the audience the night Dick Grayson's parents were murdered and later managed to discover the identities of Batman and the original Robin through their exploits. After the death of the second Robin, Jason Todd, and witnessing Batman spiral into darkness, Tim attempted to convince Dick to resume the role of Robin, stating that "Batman needs a Robin". However, Dick refused to return to being Batman's sidekick, and instead, Tim was appointed as the third Robin. Neal Adams redesigned the entire Robin costume specifically for Tim Drake's character, with the sole exception of the redesigned "R" logo by the late Norm Breyfogle.

Subsequent stories emphasize Tim's superior detective skills compared to the previous two Robins, which make him more similar to Batman. He succeeded Dick as the leader of the Teen Titans, and later led his superhero team, Young Justice. He was briefly followed in the role of Robin by Stephanie Brown, and later for a longer period by Batman's biological son, Damian Wayne, during the time Tim operated as Red Robin. Tim has been shown to have a close friendship with Superboy (Conner Kent). He has had romantic relationships with superheroes Stephanie Brown and Wonder Girl (Cassie Sandsmark), and more recently his former schoolfriend Bernard Dowd.

In 2011, Tim Drake was ranked 32nd in IGN's Top 100 Comic Book Heroes. The character has been featured in various adaptations, including several animated television series set in the DCAU beginning with The New Batman Adventures (1997–99) and also in Young Justice (2010–present), and the video game series Batman: Arkham. In 2021, Tim made his live-action debut starting in the third season of the HBO Max series Titans, portrayed by Jay Lycurgo.

Publication history
Tim Drake was named after Tim Burton, director of the then-upcoming 1989 film. The character first appeared in 1989's Batman: Year Three by the writer Marv Wolfman and interior penciler Pat Broderick, before having his origin detailed in Batman: A Lonely Place of Dying, a crossover story between the ongoing series Batman and New Titans, written by Wolfman and penciled by George Pérez and Jim Aparo (the latter with inks by Mike DeCarlo), in which he first introduced himself to Dick Grayson and impressed the former Robin with his skills. This led Grayson and later Alfred Pennyworth, Bruce Wayne's butler, to support Tim's request to be Batman's new partner. Not wanting to make the same mistake as he did with Jason Todd, Batman had Tim endure an intensive period of training that was never given to his predecessors. As such, Tim remained a non-superhero supporting character for the first year of his regular appearances in the Batman title, mainly operating in the Batcave.

The ensuing Tim Drake storylines, authored by the late Alan Grant and penciled by Norm Breyfogle, coupled with the 1989 release of Burton's Batman, spurred sales of both Batman and Detective Comics. For the latter title, Grant attested in 2007 that "when the Batman movie came out, the sales went up, if I recall correctly, from around 75,000 to about 675,000." 1989-90 was indeed the "Year of the Bat:" Capital and Diamond City Distributors reported that the Year One-inspired Batman: Legends of the Dark Knight dominated four out of the five spots for preorders (not total sales and second printings). The only exception was the third preorder spot, snagged by Batman #442, the conclusion to Tim Drake's "A Lonely Place of Dying" storyline. The "Year of the Bat" continued into the first half of 1990. Preorders for Batman and Detective Comics issues featuring a revived Joker and Penguin began to compete with, and even edged out, the last three parts of Grant Morrison's and Klaus Janson's Gothic storyline in Legends. Todd McFarlane's Spider-Man arrived in the second half of 1990, inaugurating six months of Spidermania (or Mcfarlamania, depending on the reader). DC closed out 1990 with vendors under-ordering issues, prompting the publisher to push Batman #457 and the first part of the Robin mini-series into second and then third printings. The next year, 1991, witnessed the ascension of Chris Claremont's, Jim Lee's, and Scott Williams's X-Men against Magneto, as well as Fabian Nicieza's and Rob Liefeld's X-Force, into the top of the preorder rankings. The only exception to this X-mania was, again, Tim Drake and the sequel to the Robin miniseries, the first variant issue of which garnered the third spot, firmly wedged between variant issues of X-Force and X-Men. The mini-series pitted solo Robin against the Joker, in response to fan demands for a matchup since "A Death in the Family." The 1990s comics booming bust had begun. In a supplemental interview with Daniel Best, Alan Grant added that "every issue from about that time [after the 'Year of the Bat'] that featured Robin sales went up because Robin did have his fans." Although both Grant and Breyfogle initially believed that their Anarky character could potentially become the third version of Robin, they were quick to support the editorial decision to focus on Drake. The social anarchist duo adopted the character as their own in the early 1990s, during Grant's shift to libertarian socialism but before his late 1990s emphasis on Neo Tech. Breyfogle agreed that "it was a big thing to bring in the new Robin, yes. I know my fans often point specifically to that double-page splash where his costume first appears as a big event for them as fans and I usually have to point out to them that Neal Adams was the one who designed the costume. The 'R' symbol and the staff were all that was mine." In the "Rite of Passage" storyline for Detective Comics, Grant and Breyfogle intertwined 1) Drake matching wits with Anarky; 2) a criminal and anthropological investigation into an apocryphal Haitian Vodou cult (revealed by Batman, asserting anthropological and investigative authority, as a front for extortion and crony capitalism); 3) the murder of Drake's mother by vilified cult leaders; 4) the beginning of Drake's recurrent nightmares and trauma; as well as 5) the perspective of a child of one of the cult's Haitian followers, unknowingly and inadvertently orphaned by Batman at the end of the four-issue arc.

Tim Drake eventually transitioned from preadolescence to adolescence, becoming the third Robin throughout the storylines "Rite of Passage" and "Identity Crisis," with all issues scripted by Alan Grant and penciled by Norm Breyfogle. Story arcs that included Drake only in subplots or featured his training in criminal investigation, such as "Crimesmith" and "The Penguin Affair," were either written or co-written by Grant and Wolfman, with pencils by Breyfogle, Aparo, and M. D. Bright. Immediately afterwards, the character starred in the five-issue miniseries Robin, written by Chuck Dixon, with interior pencils by Tom Lyle and cover art by Brian Bolland. The new Batman and Robin team went on their first official mission together in the story "Debut," again written by Grant and penciled by Breyfogle. Lauren R. O'Connor contends that, in early Tim Drake appearances, writers such as Grant and Chuck Dixon "had a lexicon of teenage behavior from which to draw, unlike when Dick Grayson was introduced and the concept of the teenager was still nascent. They wisely mobilized the expected adolescent behaviors of parental conflict, hormonal urges, and identity formation to give Tim emotional depth and complexity, making him a relatable character with boundaries between his two selves." In the Robin ongoing series, when Drake had fully transitioned into an adolescent character, Chuck Dixon depicted him as engaging in adolescent intimacy, yet still stopped short at overt heterosexual consummation. This narrative benchmark maintained Robin's "estrangement from sex" that began in the Grayson years. Erica McCrystal likewise observes that Alan Grant, prior to Dixon's series, connected Drake to Batman's philosophy of heroic or anti-heroic "vigilantism" as "therapeutic for children of trauma. But this kind of therapy has a delicate integration process." The overcoming of trauma entailed distinct identity intersections and emotional restraint, as well as a "complete understanding" of symbol and self. Bruce Wayne, a former child of trauma and survivor guilt, guided "other trauma victims down a path of righteousness." Tim Drake, for example, endured trauma and "emotional duress" as a result of the death of his mother (his father was in a coma and on a ventilator). Drake contemplated the idea of fear, and overcoming it, in both the "Rite of Passage" and "Identity Crisis" storylines. Grant and Breyfogle subjected Drake to recurrent nightmares, from hauntings by a ghoulish Batman to the disquieting lullaby (or informal nursery rhyme), "My Mummy's dead...My Mummy's Dead...I can't get it through my head," echoing across a cemetery for deceased parents. Drake ultimately defeated his preadolescent fears "somewhat distant from Bruce Wayne" and "not as an orphan." By the end of "Identity Crisis," an adolescent Drake had "proven himself as capable of being a vigilante" by deducing the role of fear in instigating a series of violent crimes.

As the character continued to appear in the main Batman titles, the original Robin miniseries was followed by the four-issue miniseries Robin II: The Joker's Wild!(December 1991-February 1992) and the six-issue miniseries Robin III: Cry of the Huntress (December 1992-March 1993) both also written by Dixon. Due to the success of these miniseries, DC launched the first ongoing monthly Robin series in its history, once again written by Dixon, with Tim Drake as its main adolescent character. The ongoing series continued for over 15 years, ending with issue #183. Mike Mullins on Newsarama has stated:

Throughout [the entire Robin series], the character of Robin has been captured consistently, showing him to step up to greater and greater challenges. Robin is a character who shows initiative and is driven to do what he views as right. He knows he is living up to a legacy left by Dick Grayson and strives to not disappoint Bruce Wayne, Batman. Tim is a more natural detective than previous Robins and is talented with computers, which allows him to stand in his unique spotlight. Unlike his predecessors, Tim is not the most proficient combatant and has had to work on his fighting technique, taking up the bo staff to give him an edge that Batman does not need. Tim almost always seeks to analyze a problem and outthink his opponent but has shown the ability to win a fight when necessary.

During this period, the character also featured prominently in the comic series Young Justice, written by Peter David, as a core team member from 1998 to 2003. Subsequently, Tim Drake also became a prominent team member in the new incarnation of Teen Titans written by Geoff Johns, from 2003 to 2011.

The ongoing series Robin (vol. 4) was written by Chuck Dixon until issue #100, in which the series was handed off to Jon Lewis. Lewis's run as a writer concluded with issue #120. Bill Willingham wrote the series for issues #121-147. As part of DC Comics' "One Year Later" relaunch initiative, in which the events of all ongoing titles skipped forward one year, Adam Beechen took over as writer on Robin with issue #148. Later, a return to the title by Chuck Dixon was aborted abruptly upon his departure from DC again. The final nine issues of the series were written by Fabian Nicieza, tying into the then-ongoing "Batman R.I.P." storyline.

Following the miniseries Batman: Battle For the Cowl, Tim Drake took on the new identity of the Red Robin as the character Damian Wayne was made the new Robin. The character began starring in a new Red Robin ongoing series, written for its first twelve issues by Christopher Yost and thereafter by Fabian Nicieza. The series was canceled along with the rest of DC's publishing line for The New 52 reboot.

In The New 52 period, Tim Drake primarily appeared as a main character in the Teen Titans series, with some guest appearances in the Batman titles, under the superhero name Red Robin. Tim was also the main character in the 26-issue weekly series Batman and Robin Eternal alongside the other former Robins. Meanwhile, a version of Tim from five years into the future was also a main character in the weekly series The New 52: Futures End; this alternate-future version of Tim would become the title character in the subsequent Batman Beyond series up until its relaunch with DC Rebirth.

As of the DC Rebirth relaunch, Tim Drake became the main character in the series Detective Comics written by James Tynion IV where it was reinvented as a team book. The character featured in issues #934-940 and #965-981, with some flashback appearances in the interim.

The character has subsequently become a main character in the relaunched Young Justice series written by Brian Michael Bendis.

The character received widespread media attention when it was revealed that he was bisexual in DC's relaunch initiative Infinite Frontier through Batman: Urban Legends #6 (August 2021), and is notable for being one of the most prominent LGBT characters in comic books. He subsequently received a story in DC Pride 2022 and his own Tim Drake: Pride Special before DC announced a new ongoing solo series written by Meghan Fitzmartin that will launch on September 27, 2022. The series, Tim Drake: Robin, received nomination for Outstanding Comic Book at the 34th GLAAD Media Awards.

Fictional character biography

Introduction
Tim Drake is the son of Jack Drake and Janet Drake, coming from the same social class as Bruce Wayne. When he was a young child, he visited the circus for the first time with his parents. The Drakes asked the Flying Graysons for a photo together, resulting in a momentary bond between Tim and Dick Grayson as they met for the first time. Dick Grayson's parents were murdered that night, as witnessed by Tim from the audience.

Growing up, Tim's parents were frequently absent for months at a time as they traveled around the world on archaeological digs and thus he was left in a boarding school with relatively little adult supervision. By the age of nine, Tim, who had a very sharp intellect, had deduced the identities of Batman and Robin as Bruce Wayne and Dick Grayson, after witnessing a gymnastic maneuver by Robin that he previously saw Grayson display in the Haly Circus. Inspired by the heroes' exploits, Tim trained himself in martial arts, acrobatics, detective skills, and scholastics to better himself both physically and intellectually. When Tim reached the age of thirteen, he saw that Batman had grown reckless and violent following the second Robin (Jason Todd)'s murder by the Joker. Reasoning that "Batman needs a Robin," Tim at first approached Dick Grayson – who had since become Nightwing – to ask him to become Robin again. Dick refused, but Tim's actions in an encounter with Two-Face prompted him and Alfred Pennyworth to see Tim as a potential third Robin. Batman agreed to mentor Tim, train him, and use his assistance in the Batcave, but at first refused to involve Tim in the field out of concern for the boy's safety, not wanting a repeat of Jason's fate. After a series of events involving Tim's mother's death and his father's paralysis, and Tim rescuing Batman in an encounter with the Scarecrow, Batman eventually enlisted him as the third Robin at the age of fourteen.

Robin (vol. 2) (1989–2009)

Before joining Batman as the third Robin, Tim Drake was given a modern redesign of the Robin costume and sent to train abroad with numerous experts to refine his martial arts. When Bruce Wayne retires after Knightfall, Robin goes solo to defend Gotham City. Robin would eventually go on to co-star with other teenaged superheroes in Young Justice and Teen Titans. He also made guest appearances in other DC comic books such as Nightwing and Azrael.

Robin would also become increasingly closer to fellow teen vigilante Stephanie Brown, also known as the Spoiler. Although at first, he regarded her as reckless in operating without Batman's guidance, the two would eventually become romantically involved. For a brief period when Tim's father found out about him being Robin and he retired from the role, Stephanie temporarily replaced him as the new Robin.

Following the death of his father in Identity Crisis (2004) and the presumed death of Stephanie in Batman: War Games (2004–2005), Tim relocated to Blüdhaven, the city where Nightwing fights crime, for a period of time to escape the "ghosts" of Gotham City and to stay close to his stepmother Dana Winters, who was admitted into a Blüdhaven clinic after going into psychological shock over Captain Boomerang killing Jack Drake.

Tim Drake was then given another redesign of the Robin costume with a red and black color scheme. The colors are those of Superboy's costume, in tribute to his best friend Superboy after he also died in battle in Infinite Crisis (2005–2006).

Once Dick takes over the role of Batman after Bruce's apparent death in Batman R.I.P. and Final Crisis, he fires Tim from the Robin mantle and gives it to Damian Wayne, due to Dick believing he and Tim are equals. Tim, believing that Bruce is still alive, assumes the identity of Red Robin and leaves Gotham City to go on a worldwide search for Wayne.

Red Robin (2009–2011)
Red Robin, which was launched in late 2009, depicted Tim Drake's search to find evidence that Bruce Wayne was still alive after cutting himself off from the rest of the Bat-family. He was approached by Ra's al Ghul's assassins, who were also interested in finding out what happened to Batman. At the same time, Tamara "Tam" Fox, Lucius Fox's daughter, has been sent to find Tim Drake to bring him back to Gotham. Tim goes to Iraq and manages to discover definitive proof that Bruce was alive and lost in time, but was ambushed by an assassin from the Council of Spiders. He manages to drive himself and Pru (one of the assassins working for Ra's al Ghul, who had become an ally of Tim's) to Tam's hotel room, and they are promptly abducted by the League of Assassins.

Although initially reluctant, Tim Drake allied with Ra's before nearly bleeding to death due to their encounter with the Council of Spiders. He was put in charge of the League of Assassins by Ra's and used the time to simultaneously plan how to stop the Council of Spiders and destroy the League of Assassins. After failing to foil all but one of the Council's assassination attempts, Tim realizes that the Council will be attacking the League's base, and realizes that he left Tam in danger at the base. Rushing back to base, he simultaneously manages to delay the Council of Spiders, blow up the League's base, and escape with Tam.

After crippling Ra's' League of Assassins, Drake returns to Gotham City to overthrow Ra's' plans to use Hush (surgically altered to resemble Bruce Wayne) to gain control of the Wayne family resources and destroy all that Batman held dear by directing his assassins to target all of the Batman's associates. Realizing that these attacks are a smokescreen and that the real target is coercing Hush to sign away Wayne Enterprises, Red Robin decides to confront Ra head-on. He calls upon all of his friends to protect the various targets. Drake has since moved back to Gotham City and reestablished ties with his family and friends.

After Bruce Wayne's return, Tim begins to aid his plans for expanding their mission globally with Batman, Inc. Tim is eventually appointed as the head of the newest incarnation of the Outsiders that now serve as Batman Inc.'s black-ops wing. Red Robin eventually rejoins the Teen Titans and takes over leadership from Wonder Girl. He remains the team's leader during their climactic battle against Superboy-Prime and the new Legion of Doom.

Following an adventure with the Black Bat where he faces Ra's al Ghul's sister, Tim stalks and attempts to kill a revived Captain Boomerang during the Brightest Day. Though Tim ultimately stops himself from killing Boomerang, he is chastised by Batman for his actions.

The New 52 (2011–2016)

In September 2011, The New 52 rebooted DC's continuity. In this new timeline, Teen Titans (vol. 4) #0 revealed Tim Drake's new origin, showing a large departure from his original origin, removing his connections to Dick Grayson's origin story. In The New 52, Tim is a talented athlete and computer genius who comes close to discovering Batman's identity, but never totally figures it out. When Tim finds the Batman and gets rejected for the role of sidekick, he decides to bring the Batman to him, by hacking the Penguin's bank account and donating millions of dollars, thus putting his family in danger. The Penguin's goons come after Tim and his family, but Batman saves them. Tim's parents are forced to go into witness protection, but they believe Tim deserves better and ask Bruce to take care of him for them. The Witness Protection Program renames him "Tim Drake," and he takes on the identity of the "Red Robin", rather than that of "Robin", out of respect to Jason Todd. In later issues, he is shown to be a founding member of the Teen Titans as well as their leader and he shows feelings for Wonder Girl which are reciprocated.

Tim was unwilling to meet with the rest of the Bat-family at the Batcave after he was infected with the Joker's new compound "HA". He was present when Damian was killed by the Heretic and admitted to Bruce that even though he had a dysfunctional relationship with Damian that he did grieve for him. He was also at the final battle between Batman and the Heretic when Talia killed her son's clone and blew up Wayne Tower.

Tim was also part of the Bat-family's assembled team which went to Apokolips to retrieve Damian's body. As their mission focused on retrieving Robin, Tim, Jason, and Barbara wore costumes that resembled Damian's colors and each wore a Robin symbol. Following the completion of their mission and the revival of Damian, he handed him the Robin symbol on his suit to welcome Damian back to life and the role of Robin.

In the Pre-Convergence timeline of Futures End, refugees from Earth-2 are given a signal from Brother Eye, which allows them into the Earth-0 Universe, but start a war when Darkseid follows them, leading to the deaths of the Teen Titans, except for Drake. Tim abandons his Red Robin mantle and becomes a bartender until an attack by Brainiac, where changes to the timeline are made. Brainiac is captured, and Terry McGinnis dies at the hands of Brother Eye's Batman-Joker hybrid. Tim dons the Batman Beyond suit and goes back in time and prevents Brother Eye from sending the signal to Earth-2, creating a new future where there is less destruction, and the events of Convergence and everything afterward takes place. Tim is launched into the new future, 35 years later, where he becomes the new Batman and destroys a weakened Brother Eye.

DC Rebirth (2016–present)
In DC Rebirth, Tim Drake still operates under the Red Robin alias. He gains a new and third overall Red Robin suit similar to his first Robin suit except with two "R"s as his logo instead of one. It is revealed later on in Detective Comics #965 that Tim Drake's origin story has reverted to that of the original universe, where he discovers Batman and Robin's identities after Jason Todd's death and became Robin before adopting the Red Robin persona.

Tim is primarily featured in Detective Comics as part of Batman and Batwoman's new team in Gotham, along with Orphan, Spoiler, and Clayface. Batman and Batwoman were preparing this group to combat enemies known as the Colonists, later revealed to be a military group under the command of Batwoman's father, Jake Kane, who have modeled themselves after Batman in a more violent matter. After the team rescues Batman and Tim hacks their database to discover their plans, Jake sends two waves of Bat-Drones to take down the "League of Shadows," which will kill hundreds of innocents in the process. As his teammates evacuate the locations the drones were sent to, Tim hacks the drone's mission directive to make himself the sole target, knowing that the drones will stop once the target is eliminated.

While Tim manages to take down the first wave of drones, he is killed apparently by the second wave, devastating the Bat-family and his former Teen Titans teammates. However, just before Tim was blasted by the second wave, he is teleported to an unknown place by Mister Oz and kept prisoner. Tim swore that his friends will find him.

Later, Batman learns from Ascalon, a robotic entity created by the Order of St. Dumas, that Tim is still alive, with Batman resolving to find Tim.

In Mr. Oz's prison, Tim is forced to relive his memories of the past by Mr. Oz. Realizing that Mr. Oz is using Kryptonian technology, Tim easily hacks into it and frees himself as Mr. Oz reveals his identity as Jor-El and disappears. As he tries to find a way out, Tim finds Batman but discovers this version of Batman is Tim Drake from the Titans Tomorrow future. Unable to accept a future where he decides to become Batman, Tim is forced to aid his older self in evading and containing a freed Doomsday. Tim learns from his future self that Dick, Jason, and Damian all tried to be Batman, but either retired or was forced to be put down by Tim (in the case of Damian). After Doomsday is lured back to his cell, both Tims teleport out of Mr. Oz's prison and arrive in Gotham in the Titans Tomorrow future. Before being sent back, Tim is asked by his future self to apologize to Conner, but the younger Tim has no idea who Conner is, although he later admits that the name is tugging at his heart, though he does not know why. Tim is incapacitated by his future self, as the latter decides to go back in time to kill Batwoman, the apparent cause of Tim becoming Batman. Tim returns to Gotham and is reunited with the Bat-family, but warns them about Future Tim.

After a battle with Ulysses Armstrong and Brother Eye, Tim leaves Gotham to investigate the alternate timelines, and Tim's restored memories of his past friends from Young Justice. This leads him to Metropolis, where he is reunited with Wonder Girl and Impulse, and meets Teen Lantern and Ginny Hex. The five young heroes later travel to Gemworld, where they are also reunited with Superboy and meet Princess Amethyst. Soon lost in the Multiverse, Young Justice struggles to return home, with Tim taking on the new identity of Drake during an attack by his Earth-3 counterpart. However, this identity was retired shortly after returning to his universe, and Tim returned to being Robin.

Following Infinite Frontier, Tim's history is smoothed over again, restoring his pre-New 52 histories as Batman's third apprentice and re-establishing him as having been Robin since that time. In Batman: Urban Legends, it is revealed that he and Stephanie Brown broke up off-panel and he reconnected with a friend from high school, Bernard Dowd. Bernard is kidnapped, sending Tim on a rescue mission while still trying to understand what he truly desires from life. During the rescue, Bernard tells Robin that his friend Tim helped him come out and understand himself, prompting Robin/Tim to realize his own identity as a bisexual man. Afterward, out of costume, Bernard asks Tim on a date, which Tim accepts. Tim would later tell Bruce (and the rest of the Batman Family off panel) about his breakup with Stephanie and new relationship with Bernard before moving to the Gotham marina on his own.

In Tim Drake: Robin, Tim lives on a house boat while working to forge his own path away from Batman. However, shortly after his move, Tim/Robin gets framed for a crime he didn't commit while investigating a series of murders happening to the marina residents. He works with Darcy Thomas/Sparrow (a former initiate in the We Are Robins movement) and Detective Williams to find the real culprit. But this is made more difficult by the appearance of glowing animals and mudlike creatures that take the form of trusted friends and family. Tim ultimately realizes that all these events are linked to a villain obsessed with him, with things coming to a head when Bernard gets kidnapped. Tim confronts the villain, a metahuman who uses the codename Moriarty and who dubs themselves Tim's nemesis. Tim defeats Moriarty and saves Bernard, and the couple confirm their commitment to each other.

Skills and abilities
Like Batman and other members of the Batman Family, Tim Drake possess no inherent super-powers and relies on both a combination of his combat skills, technology, and deductive abilities;  As Robin, Tim Drake underwent training under numerous masters, including Batman, Nightwing, Henri Duncard, Batgirl (Cassandra Cain), and Lady Shiva. 

Overtime, the character became adept in the usage of technology and became versed in several expressed styles of martial arts such as Aikido, Karate, Boxing, Judo, Kung Fu, Tai Chi, Krav Maga, and esoteric Tibetian martial styles in which includes healing arts (which utilizes pressure points). In battle, he also favored a bo staff and was trained in its usage by Lady Shiva herself. Overtime, Tim's skills developed, his intelligence improving to a level where he was able excel in computer science and gain a grasp of assorted scientific techniques, including biology, engineering, and genetics, which he has witnessed his attempts at re-cloning Superboy. As Red Robin, these skills became more advanced and he would be considered an expert martial artist and possess a genius with an IQ of 142, whose forte within the Batman Family includes his intelligence, detective skills, and computer hacking capabilities. His high level of intelligence has also lent him praise from Ra's Al Ghul, being one of the few Batman Family members he addressed distinctively as "Detective".

Tim is also capable of speaking several languages beyond his native English, including Cantonese, Russian, Spanish and German. Tim is also considered a natural leader, having led teams such as the Teen Titans and Young Justice. As a precaution, Bruce inoculated Tim, as well as his other close allies, against several toxins the Batman family has encountered, including Joker Venom, the Scarecrow's fear toxin, and some of Poison Ivy's pheromones. While this does not create a full immunity, it does give them a strong resistance, allowing them to continue fighting or escape when exposed to the substances.

Costumes

Tim Drake's original Robin costume had a red torso, yellow stitching and belt, black boots, green short sleeves, gloves, and pants. He wore a cape that was black on the outside and yellow on the inside. This costume was different from that of his predecessors in that it provided increased protection with an armored tunic and gorget, long boots, an emergency "R" shuriken on his chest in addition to the traditional batarangs and a collapsible bo staff as the character's primary weapon.

Following Infinite Crisis and 52, Tim Drake modified his costume to favor a mostly red and black color scheme in tribute to his best friend, Superboy (Kon-El), who died fighting Earth-Prime's Superboy. This Robin costume had a red torso, long sleeves, and pants, with a cape that was black on the outside and yellow on the inside. It also had yellow stitching and a matching belt, a black domino mask, gloves, and boots.

Tim Drake resumed the motif of a red and black costume when he took on the identity of the Red Robin. The Red Robin costume consisted of a long-sleeved red tunic, along with black boots, tights, gloves, cape, and cowl. It also included a black-and-gold utility belt that carries Drake's weaponry, such as his bo staff and throwing discs. After Drake's confrontation with Ra's al Ghul in Red Robin #12, the costume was slightly altered with spiked gauntlets, a cropped tunic, and a new utility belt.

The theme of a red and black costume continued in 2011 with Tim Drake's New 52 Red Robin outfit. The costume was altered considerably, as it was a single-piece red and black costume, with assorted belts on his waist and legs. The full cowl was replaced with a black domino mask, similar to his previous two Robin costume designs. His chest harness was attached to a set of rocket-powered wings, designed by Virgil Hawkins a.k.a. Static, that allow the Red Robin the ability to fly. He continued to use his bo staff and other assorted equipment.

In the 2016 DC Rebirth relaunch, Tim Drake maintains the role of the Red Robin. This Red Robin costume serves as a homage to his first Robin costume. His costume is returned to a similar look as his original Robin costume consisting of a red torso, yellow utility belt, black pants, green short sleeves, gloves, and boots. He also has a new cape that is black on the outside and yellow on the inside, similar to the Robin cape. While his Red Robin suit is similar to his first Robin suit, it has two "R"s as his logo instead of one, to show that he is no longer Robin and now the Red Robin. The mask is similar to his New 52 domino mask. His bo staff remains his primary weapon.

With the revived Young Justice series, Tim has returned to the identity of Robin. His new costume shares similarities with his DC Rebirth suit; however, it has various adjustments and revisions. His suit still has the red torso, black pants, and armored sleeves; however, his pants now merge into split-toed boots with green highlights, losing the green leg guards. He has replaced the bulkier arm guards with smaller arm guards with blades similar to Damian Wayne's Robin suit. His cape, while still black and gold, is now scalloped to look similar to his later OYL cape. Tim's double-R logo has been replaced with his original single "R" logo. He continues to use a bo-staff as his primary weapon.

For a brief period in Young Justice, Tim adopted the Drake identity, wielding a bo staff and wearing a capeless brown suit with black on the arms and boots and gold accents, before returning to his original Robin costume in Young Justice (vol. 3) #19.

Alternate versions

Batman Beyond
Set after the events of Batman Beyond: Return of the Joker, Tim Drake serves as a supporting character in the ongoing Batman Beyond comic book series. It is suggested that, after a series of examinations, he is freed from the Joker's control although the experience has left him with doubts and he continues to struggle to keep his sanity intact. His wife is revealed to have been aware of her husband's heroic and tortured past and implied to have met Tim and his former mentor at some point before he retires as Robin.

Bruce offered Tim a job in his company, which he accepted after he merged it with Lucius Fox Jr.'s company Foxteca and renamed the company Wayne Incorporated. The condition was that Tim would not get himself involved with the superheroic activities of Bruce, Terry, or the JLU, and Bruce would pay for his children's college tuition. He is currently working as a communications expert, handling satellites and other associated technology.

Titans Tomorrow 

In the "Titans Tomorrow" story arc during writer Geoff Johns' run on Teen Titans, Robin and the rest of the team encounter future versions of themselves from a time after all of their mentors have been killed. As a brutal new Batman, Tim Drake personally hunted down every member of his mentor's Rogues Gallery, turning Arkham Asylum into a cemetery filled with the graves of the original Batman's enemies, whom Tim killed using the same pistol that Joe Chill used to murder Thomas and Martha Wayne when Bruce was a child. Tim had difficulty accepting that he could ever adopt such brutal methods as the direct successor to Batman, who always maintained a strict policy against murder. In a final battle culminating in both present and future Titans colliding, the battle ends in a stalemate. Using a Cosmic Treadmill in the adult Tim's Batcave, Robin and his team return home to contemplate the future they have seen.

Injustice: Gods Among Us
In this reality, based on the video game of the same name, Tim Drake was a new member of the Teen Titans as the Red Robin at the time the Joker's nuclear explosion went off in Metropolis. The Titans tracked down Superman to the Fortress of Solitude, where he attempted to stop Superman. Tim tries lifting the Phantom Zone projector, but cannot because Superman placed a safety cap that weighs 100 tons. When Superboy is mortally wounded, Tim and the other Titans are sent by Superman to the Phantom Zone.

In the prequel to Injustice 2, Tim and the Titans (minus Superboy) are finally rescued by the remaining heroes. But just as he is reuniting with Batman, General Zod escapes the Phantom Zone and kills Tim by piercing Tim's heart with his heat vision.

DC Bombshells
Tim Drake appears in the DC Bombshells continuity as a former prisoner of Katherine-Webb Kane's orphanage, where he and the others were forced to build robots for Axis supporters. He is eventually rescued by the Batgirls, whom he joins afterward, wearing a baseball costume similar to his Robin costume on the mainstream Earth-0. He appears close to Alysia Yeoh.

The New 52: Futures End and Batman Beyond
In the Futures End series, an older Tim Drake takes the role of Batman after Terry McGinnis dies. In 2015, Drake stars in the new Batman Beyond series. In the series, Tim Drake faked his death during the war between Prime-Earth and Earth-2 and became a bar owner by the name of Cal Corcoran. He assisted Terry McGinnis, who had come back through time to prevent the creation of Brother Eye. After Terry was killed in action defending Drake from Brother Eye's Batman/Joker hybrid (a Brother Eye-controlled fusion of Batman and the Joker from Terry's timeline), he passed on his futuristic Batsuit to Tim and, in his dying words, asked him to become the new Batman and go back through time to prevent the war between Prime Earth and Earth 2, which he believed will prevent the creation of Brother Eye.

He successfully travels back through time five years using a time band and convinces Brother Eye to not send a beacon to attract the surviving heroes of Earth-2, thus preventing the war with Earth 2. Following the completion of his mission, Brother Eye sends Tim back to Terry's timeline, hoping to find Terry alive so he can return the Batsuit to him. However, what he finds is still the same future Terry came from; realizing that Terrifitech is a constant and Brother Eye cannot be defeated in the past, Tim declares that Brother Eye has not won yet.

A few days later, Tim stops a break-in at a Wayne-Powers facility by Jokerz who is attempting to steal a critical component that keeps Brother Eye from detecting Gotham City. He later meets up with Terry's brother Matt, who is angry at Tim for wearing his brother's costume and, in private, declares that he should have been the one who succeeded Terry as Batman.

Following the meeting, Tim heads outside Gotham City to an internment camp that is holding all people captured by Brother Eye. Before he can break into the facility, he is attacked by a Brother Eye-converted Superman, who attempts to kill him. Knowing he cannot kill Superman, A.L.F.R.E.D overloads the Batsuits power reserves, temporally injuring Superman. As a result, the Batsuit deactivates itself, leaving Tim in his civilian attire and defenseless against Brother Eye's army. He is then captured and placed in a detention center, where he meets Terry's friend Max Gibson and, to his surprise, Barbara Gordon.

However, following the return of the original Wally West from the Pre-Flashpoint timeline, during DC Rebirth, the present resets to accommodate his existence, and ripples across reality end up bring Terry McGinnis back to life, allowing him to resume his role as the Future Batman. The future New 52 Tim has been erased due to the timeline change; however, the Titans Tomorrow version of Tim returns in his place, who goes on to become an anti-hero against the Teen Titans.

Nightwing: The New Order
In this alternate reality, Nightwing ends an ongoing feud between superpowered beings by activating a device that depowers 90% of the superpowered population. This builds to a future where superpowers are outlawed and any superpowered being must take inhibitor medications or be contained and studied should the medications not work on them. In 2040, Tim retired from his Red Robin days and is now raising his three children. When Dick becomes a fugitive after it is discovered his son Jake had superpowers, Tim uses his computer skills to help Dick locate Jake. Tim believes that Dick made the right choice in depowering the population.

DCEASED
Drake, along with Dick Grayson, is among the first superheroes to be infected by the Anti-Life Equation. Batman attempts to talk to them, only to be infected by both of them. Tim is killed off-panel, with his corpse left in the Batcave, and is later found and buried by Jason Todd.

In other media

Television

Live-action
 Tim Drake made his live-action debut on the third season of Titans, portrayed by Jay Lycurgo. This version is a young Gotham City resident who works as a delivery boy and idolizes Batman. After hearing news of Jason Todd's death, he deduces Nightwing's identity and approaches him to become the new Robin, but is turned down. Despite this, Tim still wishes to help the Titans and assists them in tracking down Jonathan Crane and the resurrected Todd/Red Hood, only to be shot by the former. In the afterlife, Tim meets Donna Troy and Hank Hall, and teams up with them to escape. Later, he reunites with Donna and together they discover that Crane plans to have corrupt police officers on his payroll assault Tim's city block, prompting Donna to lead the residents in fighting back. Eventually, Tim meets and teams up with the rest of the Titans and helps to save Gotham from Crane. Afterward, Dick Grayson praises Tim's fighting skills, but tells him that he needs proper training and invites him to join the team in San Francisco.

Animation
Tim Drake appears media set in the DC Animated Universe:
Tim first appears in The New Batman Adventures, voiced by Mathew Valencia. This version has elements of Jason Todd, namely his somewhat rebellious personality and backstory as a young street thief whose father, Steven "Shifty" Drake, was murdered by Two-Face. Additionally, his Robin costume looks identical to Dick Grayson's Robin costume from Batman: The Animated Series, but with black sleeves, gloves, and briefs with red leggings, similar to his appearance post-Infinite Crisis.
Robin made guest appearances on other DCAU productions, teaming up with Superman in Superman: The Animated Series in the episode "Knight Time", wherein Valencia reprises his role, and Static in the Static Shock episodes "The Big Leagues" and "Future Shock", where he is voiced by Eli Marienthal and Shane Sweet, respectively; in the Static Shock episode "Hard as Nails", he is also confirmed by Batman to be a member of the Titans.
Tim Drake made cameo appearances in Justice League, as an alternate version of himself in the first season finale "The Savage Time" and in Superman's funeral in the second season episode "Hereafter".
Tim Drake appears as a supporting character in Young Justice: Invasion, voiced by Cameron Bowen. This iteration's Robin costume is similar to his "One Year Later" costume with some modern influences, and he uses a bo staff like in the comics. He is introduced in the episode "Happy New Year" as the third version of Robin. In the episode "Satisfaction", he is seen observing Jason Todd's memorial. Tim is shown as initially hesitant to take on leadership roles, something he feels is somewhat forced on by Nightwing. Despite this, the two are shown to have a brotherly connection to one another. This familial relationship also extends to the more experienced Batgirl. Like Dick Grayson in season one, Tim is forbidden from revealing his secret identity to the team, wearing concealing sunglasses when out of costume. In "Endgame", it is shown that he is in a relationship with Wonder Girl after Kid Flash's demise gave Wonder Girl the courage to kiss him. Due to the large cast of this show, Tim's role was mainly as a background character and was only highlighted on certain occasions. His detective skills were imperative in helping the Blue Beetle overcome control by the Reach. Tim would later feature in Young Justice: Outsiders, where he, along with Arrowette and Stephanie Brown, leave the team as part of Batman's planned resignation from the Justice League to combat the metahuman trafficking crisis without being restricted by the United Nation's charter. Tim, Arrowette, and the Spoiler then form their team under "Batman Inc.", along with Orphan, with Tim serving on the heroes' "Anti-Light," along with Batman, Nightwing, Miss Martian, Oracle, Wonder Woman and Aquaman. Throughout the season, Tim faces relationship issues with Cassie, due to his decision to leave the team to join Batman's team and continue to keep secrets from her. At the end of the season, he rejoins the team. In Young Justice: Phantoms, he switched over to the Outsiders. He attended Superboy and Miss Martian's wedding in the season four finale and appears to be having a relationship with Spoiler similar to the comics.

Film
Tim Drake appears in Batman: Mystery of the Batwoman, voiced again by Eli Marienthal. He helps Batman stop Batwoman's violent rampage and also briefly befriends one of the suspects, Wayne Tech employee Rocky Ballantine.
Tim Drake appears in Batman Beyond: Return of the Joker, where Valencia reprises his role as the younger version, while Dean Stockwell voices the middle-aged version of the character. A flashback reveals that sometime after Dick Grayson left Gotham following the end of The New Batman Adventures, the Joker and Harley Quinn kidnapped him while he was on solo patrol and over the course of three weeks tortured him to the point of insanity, transforming him into a miniature version of the Joker dubbed "Joker Jr." or "J.J". He was eventually found by Batman and Batgirl and ordered to kill them by Joker, but killed him instead before suffering a complete nervous breakdown. While Tim was able to recover with help from Leslie Thompkins, he was completely traumatized by the incident and retired from his role as Robin. By 2039, Tim became a communications engineer with a wife and two children and has become resentful of his past life and Bruce, though he keeps in touch with Barbara. However, Tim is unwittingly transformed into the Joker via stolen genetics technology embedded in his spine during his captivity. He is finally freed from Joker's control when the new Batman destroys the microchip and Tim is taken to the hospital to fully recover from his trauma. In the Justice League Unlimited episode "Epilogue", it is revealed that the nanotechnology with which Tim was brainwashed belonged to Project Cadmus and was stolen by the Joker off-screen.
 Tim Drake as Red Robin appears in Batman Unlimited: Animal Instincts and Batman Unlimited: Monster Mayhem, voiced by Yuri Lowenthal. In the former, he is called "Red Robin" only once and by his original moniker every other time in Animal Instincts, but is consistently addressed by his new name during the latter. However, Alfred Pennyworth does once refer to him by his real name, confirming this version of the Red Robin is Tim Drake. He is mentioned but not seen in the sequel, Batman Unlimited: Mechs vs. Mutants, where Alfred says he left Gotham to lead his team.
 A young boy named Tim "Timmy" Drake appears in Batman: Gotham by Gaslight, voiced by Tara Strong. He and two other orphan boys, Dickie and Jason, try to rob a couple, but Batman stops them and defeats the Fagin-like a criminal who is ordering them to steal.
 A Feudal Japan version of Tim Drake / Red Robin appears in Batman Ninja, voiced by Kengo Kawanishi in Japanese and by Will Friedle in English.
 Tim appears in one of the alternate storylines of the interactive film Batman: Death in the Family, voiced by Nick Carson. In one end, he saves Jason Todd / Red Robin from Two-Face and convinces him not to murder him, as it would go against Batman's moral code. This leads to Jason changing his ways and adopting Tim as his new sidekick Bat Kid.

Video games
 Tim Drake appears in Batman: Dark Tomorrow, voiced by Jonathan Roumie.
 Tim Drake appears as a playable character in Batman: Rise of Sin Tzu, voiced by Scott Menville.
 Tim Drake appears in DC Universe Online, voiced by Wil Wheaton.
 Tim Drake appears as a playable character in Young Justice: Legacy, voiced again by Cameron Bowen.
 Tim Drake appears in Infinite Crisis, voiced again by Cameron Bowen.
 Tim Drake appears as one of the four main playable characters in the 2022 video game Gotham Knights, voiced by Sloane Morgan Siegel.

Lego
 Tim Drake appears as one of the main two playable characters, alongside Batman, in Lego Batman: The Videogame, voiced by James Arnold Taylor.
 Tim Drake appears as a main character in Lego Batman 2: DC Superheroes, voiced by Charlie Schlatter. His Red Robin incarnation is also playable in the Nintendo DS, Nintendo 3DS, PlayStation Vita, IOS, and Android versions.
 Tim Drake appears as a main character in Lego Batman 3: Beyond Gotham, with Charlie Schlatter reprising his role.
 Tim Drake appears as a non-playable character in Lego Dimensions, voiced by Scott Menville. He is one of three characters, alongside Frodo Baggins and MetalBeard, to be kidnapped by Lord Vortech due to possessing Kryptonite, which is one of the Foundation Elements that the villain seeks. The three are later fused into a robot called the Tri, which is defeated by Batman, Gandalf the Grey, and Wyldstyle, and separates back into the trio.
 Tim Drake as Red Robin appears as a playable character in Lego DC Super-Villains, voiced again by Cameron Bowen.

Batman: Arkham

Tim Drake as Robin appears as a supporting character in Rocksteady Studios' Batman: Arkham series. This version is grittier and darker than his depiction in the comics, which the producers found to be fitting with the overall tone of the series. His costume incorporates the traditional red and yellow colors, but he sports a more muscled appearance with a short buzz-cut (similar to Dick Grayson's hairstyle in Batman & Robin). He is also shown to be dating Barbara Gordon, whom he eventually marries. 
 Robin first appears in Batman: Arkham City, voiced by Troy Baker. He makes a brief appearance during the main story, while Batman is following a League of Shadows assassin to find Ra's al Ghul. Robin explains that he was called by Alfred to assist Batman in Arkham City, but the latter declines his help and asks him to look after Gotham in his absence, as well as analyze a sample of the Joker's infected blood. Robin is a playable character with the addition of the Harley Quinn's Revenge DLC, set after the main story, wherein he rescues Batman after the latter is taken captive by Harley Quinn in Arkham City. Robin is also playable in the game's challenge maps, and has two alternate costumes: his classic Red Robin suit from the comics, and Dick Grayson's Robin costume from Batman: The Animated Series.
 Robin appears as a boss in the mobile game Batman: Arkham City Lockdown, set a few weeks before Arkham City. While attempting to apprehend Poison Ivy, who escaped from Arkham Asylum, he is placed under her mind control, and later forced to fight Batman when he arrives to capture Ivy. Batman ultimately defeats both of them and releases Robin from the mind control.
 Robin plays a major supporting role in Batman: Arkham Knight, voiced by Matthew Mercer. Throughout the game, both he and Barbara attempt to convince Batman to allow him to assist in taking down the Scarecrow, but Batman insists that Robin looks after the patients infected with the Joker's  blood, whom they are keeping at their hideout at the abandoned Panessa Studios. Batman also tells Robin to work on a cure, but avoids revealing that he too is infected. When Harley Quinn and her gang attack Panessa Studios to liberate the patients, Batman and Robin team up to stop her, and in the process, Robin finds out that Batman is infected with the Joker's blood. Robin insists that Batman be locked up for his own safety and let him handle the Scarecrow, only to be locked up himself after Batman refuses, not wanting Robin to get himself killed. Near the end of the game, the Scarecrow kidnaps both Robin and James Gordon to force Batman to surrender to him. While Batman manages to subdue the Scarecrow, his secret identity is exposed to the public in the process. At the end of the game, Batman seemingly commits suicide to protect his loved ones, leaving Robin and Barbara to continue fighting crime in Gotham.
Aside from the main story, Robin appears in the Batgirl: A Matter of Family DLC, set before the series' first installment, wherein he and Barbara (as Batgirl) infiltrate a defunct oil rig to rescue Gordon and other police officers who are being held hostage by the Joker. He is also the main character of the A Flip of the Coin DLC, set after the events of the main story, where he tries to apprehend Two-Face at Hell's Gate Disposal Service while struggling to live up to Batman's legacy. Eventually, Robin was made a playable character in all of the game's challenge maps via an update, and given four alternate costumes: his classic, New 52, and One Year Later suits from the comics, and Dick Grayson's Robin costume from the 1960s Batman TV series.
 Robin makes a brief appearance in Batman: Arkham VR, voiced by Tom Austen. He is captured and later killed by Killer Croc in the sewers, despite Batman's efforts to save him. At the end of the game, it is revealed that a Joker-possessed Batman orchestrated Robin's death, though it is also implied that the game's events were merely a nightmare in Batman's mind.

Injustice
 Tim Drake, as Red Robin, appears on a card in the iOS version of Injustice: Gods Among Us. His name is also listed on a hit list during Deathstroke's victory outro.
 Tim Drake, as Red Robin, makes a cameo appearance in Injustice 2 in Cyborg's ending as one of the deceased Teen Titans brought back to life by Cyborg with Brainiac's powers.

Collected editions
Tim Drake's earliest appearances as Robin were reprinted in trade paperback form shortly after their original publication. However, the ongoing series Robin was not regularly reprinted in trade paperbacks until the beginning of Bill Willingham's run as a writer with issue #121. The entire series was reprinted from that point onwards, as was its successor ongoing series Red Robin. All trade paperbacks from this period have since gone out of print.

Beginning in 2015, DC began publishing new editions of trade paperbacks collecting Robin-centric stories starring Tim Drake. These collections began with the story arcs "Rite of Passage" and "Identity Crisis", and continued onward to include the three Robin miniseries and begin collecting the Robin ongoing series. Publication of these trade paperbacks stopped after five volumes.

Other collected editions
 Batman: A Lonely Place Of Dying
 Batman: Knightfall Vol. 2: Knightquest (new edition) (Robin (vol. 4) #7)
 Batman: Knightfall Vol. 3: KnightsEnd (new edition) (Robin (vol. 4) #8–9 and 11–13)
 Batman: Prodigal (Robin (vol. 4) #11–13)
 Batman: Contagion (Robin (vol. 4) #27–28)
 Batman: Legacy (Robin (vol. 4) #32–33)
 Batman: Cataclysm (Robin (vol. 4) #53)
 Batman: No Man's Land Vol. 2 (modern edition) (Robin (vol. 4) #67)
 Batman: No Man's Land Vol. 3 (modern edition) (Robin (vol. 4) #68–72)
 Batman: No Man's Land Vol. 4 (modern edition) (Robin (vol. 4) #73)
 Batman: New Gotham Vol. 2: Officer Down (Robin (vol. 4) #86)
 Bruce Wayne: Murderer? (Robin (vol. 4) #98–99)
 Batman: War Games Vol. 1 (modern edition) (Robin (vol. 4) #121, 126–129)
 Batman: War Games Vol. 2 (modern edition) (Robin (vol. 4) #130–131)
 Teen Titans Vol. 5: Life and Death (Robin (vol. 4) #146–147)
 Batman: The Resurrection of Ra's al Ghul (Robin (vol. 4) #168–169 and Annual #7)
 Batman: Gotham Shall Be Judged (Red Robin #22)
 Tim Drake: Pride Special #1 (Urban Legends #4-6, 10 and "Elephant in the Room")

See also

Alternative versions of Robin
List of Batman supporting characters
List of DC Comics characters

References

External links
 Robin at DC Comics' official website
 Tim Drake at DC Comics' official website
 
 
 
 
 Tim Drake on IMDb
 Tim Drake's Bibliography
 Podcast interview with Robin comics artist Freddie Williams II

Batman characters
Characters created by Marv Wolfman
Characters created by Pat Broderick
DC Comics sidekicks
Comics characters introduced in 1989
DC Comics male superheroes
DC Comics martial artists
DC Comics child superheroes
DC Comics LGBT superheroes
DC Comics orphans
Fictional acrobats
Fictional blade and dart throwers
Fictional bojutsuka
Fictional business executives
Fictional gymnasts
Fictional hackers
Fictional bisexual males
Fictional detectives
Fictional criminologists
Robin (character)
Superheroes who are adopted
Teenage characters in comics
Vigilante characters in comics